Beuth may refer to:

 Beuth (locomotive)
 Christian Peter Wilhelm Beuth
 Peter Beuth
 Beuth Verlag, a subsidiary of the DIN Group (Deutsches Institut für Normung) in charge of the publication of German standards